The 2020–21 Afghanistan Premier League was scheduled to be the second edition of the Afghanistan Premier League Twenty20 (T20) franchise cricket tournament. Balkh Legends are the defending champions.

Originally, the tournament was scheduled to take place in October 2019 at the Sharjah Cricket Stadium. However, in September 2019, it was announced that the tournament would be postponed until 2020, due to payment issues and "risks for league's integrity". In October 2020, the Afghanistan Cricket Board announced its plans to re-launch the tournament, with the possibility of it taking place in December 2020 or January 2021.

References

2019 in Afghan cricket
2020 in Afghan cricket
Afghanistan Premier League
Domestic cricket competitions in 2020–21